Anthony Esmond Sheridan McGinnity (21 May 1940 – 16 February 2013), known professionally as Tony Sheridan, was an English rock and roll guitarist who spent much of his adult life in Germany. He was best known as an early collaborator of the Beatles (though the record was labelled as being with "The Beat Brothers"), one of two non-Beatles (the other being Billy Preston) to receive label performance credit on a record with the group, and the only non-Beatle to appear as lead singer on a Beatles recording which charted as a single.

Biography
Sheridan was born in Norwich, Norfolk, where he grew up at 2 Hansell Road in Thorpe St Andrew and attended the City of Norwich School.

His parents, Alphonsus McGinnity and Audrey Mann, were married in Norwich in 1939. In his early life, Sheridan was influenced by their interest in classical music, and by age seven, he had learned to play the violin. He eventually came to play guitar, and in 1956, formed his first band. He showed enough talent that he soon found himself playing in London's "Two I's" club for some six months straight.

In 1958, aged 18, he began appearing on Oh Boy!, made by the ITV contractor ABC, playing electric guitar on such early rock classics as "Blue Suede Shoes", "Glad All Over", "Mighty Mighty Man" and "Oh, Boy!" He was soon employed backing a number of singers, reportedly including Gene Vincent and Conway Twitty while they were in England. In 1958 Johnny Foster sought to recruit Sheridan as a guitar player in Cliff Richard's backing band (soon renamed the Shadows), but after failing to find him at the 2i's Coffee Bar opted for another guitarist who was there, Hank Marvin. Early in 1960, he performed in a tour of the UK, along with  Vincent and Eddie Cochran. On 16 April, Vincent and Cochran rebuffed his request to ride along with them to the next venue. He therefore escaped the road accident which would leave Cochran dead and Vincent badly injured.

Sheridan played guitar for Cherry Wainer on her recording of "Happy Organ". Despite these successes, his penchant for being late, showing up without his guitar, etc., soon got him a reputation for having gone a bit "haywire", and cost him much of his professional standing in England. Providentially, an offer for a gig came from Bruno Koschmider's "Kaiserkeller" club in Hamburg, Germany for an English group to play there. Sheridan and others (including Colin "Melander" Crawley) joined an ad hoc group promptly dubbed "The Jets" and were put on the ship headed for Hamburg. As fate would have it, legal woes (i.e. lack of proper papers) caused "The Jets" to not last long, but Sheridan (and now-friend Crawley) were soon back onstage in Hamburg.

While performing in Hamburg between 1960 and 1963, Sheridan employed various backup bands, most of which were really "pickup bands", or simply an amalgam of various musicians, rather than a group proper (though almost always including now bassist Colin "Melander" Crawley and usually top-pianist Roy Young). However, in 1961, the young Beatles (with their line-up at the time of John Lennon, Paul McCartney, George Harrison, Stuart Sutcliffe and Pete Best) who had met and admired Sheridan during their first visit to Hamburg in 1960, and who worked with him on their second visit, became even closer. The Beatles sometimes backed Sheridan, who, in turn, often joined the Beatles during their own sets backing them on guitar. They even visited Sheridan's home and had jam sessions in the back garden.

When a colleague of German Polydor producer/A & R man Bert Kaempfert saw the pairing on stage, he suggested that Sheridan and the Beatles make some recordings together. Kaempfert viewed Sheridan as the one with "star" potential, and though Kaempfert's production company signed the Beatles to play on Sheridan's records, the contract stipulated that the four Beatles (Lennon, McCartney, Harrison and Best) were guaranteed to play on a minimum of two songs. Of the seven songs recorded during Sheridan's two-day-long sessions for Polydor in June 1961, at times the band behind Sheridan would be down to only two Beatles (Paul McCartney and Pete Best). Conversely some say that only on their two songs do all four Beatles play (minus Sheridan), while Sheridan plays on all of his tracks. John Lennon's rhythm guitar is heard only on the two Beatles tracks (though his voice is heard in background vocals as well as his handclaps on Sheridan's tracks) (per "Beatles Deeper Undercover" by Kristopher Engelhardt, p. 302) These sessions produced Sheridan's "My Bonnie" and "The Saints", and the Beatles' "Ain't She Sweet" and "Cry for a Shadow" (formerly titled "Beatle Bop"), plus three other songs.

Polydor's beliefs in Sheridan's coming stardom were so strong that they buried the two Beatles tracks until much later. Additionally John Lennon, Pete Best and Tony Sheridan all swore that there were several other Beatles tracks that were recorded during the two-day session, but they have not surfaced. In the Spring of 1962 in order to fulfill contractual obligations, the four surviving Beatles (plus Roy Young but without Sheridan) recorded an instrumental version of Sweet Georgia Brown; later, Sheridan cut his vocal overdub for the song while solo in the studio. (Reportedly "Swanee River" was also recorded by the Beatles and Roy Young, though Polydor released a version in 1962 on Sheridan's album My Bonnie; however, Polydor states they've never found this last recording). A newspaper story of the day also mentioned that Sheridan had recorded "You Are My Sunshine" with the Beatles as well for single release (it was also on his album as well).

In 1962, after a series of singles (the first of which, "My Bonnie"/"The Saints" made it to number 5 in the German chart), the record was released in America on Decca with a black label and also in a pink label for demo play. The record has the distinction of being one of the most expensive collectible 45 rpm with the black label in mint condition selling for $15,000 in 2007 and the pink label selling for $3000. Ringo Starr briefly played in Sheridan's backing band during very early 1962, before returning to Rory Storm and the Hurricanes. Starr was reportedly unhappy with Sheridan performing songs he had not rehearsed with his band (other musicians made the same complaint, as well as about Sheridan's penchant for fist-fights).

Also in 1962, Polydor released the album My Bonnie across Germany. The word "Beatles" was judged to sound too similar to the Hamburgisch dialect word "Pidels" (pronounced "peedles"), the plural of a slang term for penis, hence the album was credited to "Tony Sheridan and the Beat Brothers". After the Beatles had gained fame, the album was re-released in the United Kingdom, with the credit altered to "Tony Sheridan and the Beatles". The Beatles' Hamburg studio recordings, as well as some live recordings from the same period, have been reissued many times.

Later career

In the mid-1960s, Sheridan's musical style underwent a drastic transformation, away from his rock and roll roots and towards a more blues- and jazz-oriented sound. Though those recordings were praised by some, many fans of his earlier work felt disappointed. The change was presaged by liner notes from his 1964 album, Just a Little Bit of Tony Sheridan, in which his musical preferences are listed as "jazz and classical" rather than rock. The liner notes also mention his wanting to visit the southern US "to hear at first hand the original negro music and experience the atmosphere that has been instrumental in creating negro jazz and the spiritual, for which he has a great liking." During 1967, Polydor continued releasing Tony Sheridan singles recorded German producer Jimmy Bowien, though they only ever released two albums by him.

By 1967, Sheridan had become disillusioned with his Beatle-brought fame. Because he was more concerned by the Vietnam War and the thought of further Communist aggression, Sheridan agreed to perform for the Allied troops. While in Vietnam, the band that he had assembled was fired upon and one of the members was killed. For his work entertaining the troops, Sheridan was made an honorary Captain of the United States Army. Due to the repeated shellings he experienced in Vietnam, Sheridan henceforth suffered from great sensitivity to the sounds of any kind of explosions, even fireworks.

With his Polydor contract gone, Sheridan did what he could to survive. In the early 1970s, he managed to cut a single as a pop duo, teamed with Carole Bell, and they toured Europe together with fair success. Following that phase he returned to playing in Germany (usually Hamburg) or London. The mid-1970s saw him deejaying a West German radio programme of blues music, which was well received. He then managed to record an entire live album of early rock classics, a number of which had been part of his and the early Beatles live act but had never been recorded.

In 1978, a record producer in the United States heard Sheridan's early Polydor recordings (with and without the young Beatles), and was impressed by Sheridan's singing and playing. Sheridan immediately accepted an offer record a whole studio album in Los Angeles. Elvis Presley's TCB Band, not working at the time, was hired to play on the album along with top bassist (and former Hamburg friend) Klaus Voormann. An album of rock classics plus a few country tunes resulted but, with no major label release, it was restricted to direct TV sales. Thus, the prospect of a long American career in Las Vegas evaporated.

In 1978, the Star Club was reopened, and Sheridan performed there along with Elvis Presley's TCB Band.

In 1991, Joe Sunseri, Sheridan's biographer and then-manager, completed Nobody's Child: The Tony Sheridan Story. However, due to a falling-out, the biography remained unpublished. A biography of Sheridan, titled The Teacher, was eventually published in 2013 by Norfolk author Alan Mann, a childhood-friend of Sheridan. The book was essentially an email question and answer interview. While repeated probings by the author did elicit the fact that Sheridan spent two weeks spent in an English jail, the author unfortunately took Sheridan's memory of things at total face value.

On 13 August 2002, Sheridan released Vagabond, largely a collection of his own material, but including a new cover version of "Skinny Minnie", a song he had recorded years earlier for his first album. Sheridan also played guitar and sang for the Argentinian rock musician Charly Garcia. The album, called Influencia, was released in 2002. In 2015, Colin "Melander" Crawley, Sheridan's former bassist, published another biography, Tony Sheridan – The One The Beatles Called "The Teacher"(). Of the two published biographies, it gives the most insight into Sheridan's major career of the early '60's.

Personal life
Sheridan lived in Seestermühe, a village north of Hamburg, and in addition to music, in his later life he was interested in heraldry and designed coats of arms. Sheridan was extremely secretive about his personal life, although it's known that he was married three times, lastly to Anna Sievers, and previously to Rosi Heitmann and to Hazel Byng. His friend and former bassist Crawley stated that in 1960 Sheridan confided that despite his mixed Irish-Catholic and Jewish background, he was at that point viewing himself as a Buddhist. Later Sheridan became a devotee of the guru Bhagwan Sri Rajneesh and lived in the 1980s at the guru's Rajneeshpuram commune in Oregon, United States.

Death
Tony Sheridan died on 16 February 2013 in Hamburg, after undergoing heart surgery.

Discography

Studio albums
 1961: My Bonnie with The Beat Brothers (later changed to read with The Beatles after their success) - #28 Billboard, released in the U.S. in 1964; "Why" - #88 Billboard, released in 1964
 1964: Just a Little Bit of Tony Sheridan with the Big Six
 1984: Novus (Denmark)  
 1986: Ich lieb Dich so
 1987: Dawn Colours (Italy) (The only Sheridan album to bear a clear dedication to his Beatle pals, though pointedly leaving out both Pete Best and the late Stuart Sutcliffe. It reads, "Dedicated to John, Paul, George, Ringo in fond recollection of the fantastic crazy days in Hamburg. Special Thanks to Albert Lee". All original Sheridan songs, though the final tune ("Goodbye") shares the title with a Beatles-McCartney-penned tune.) 
 1989: Here & Now! – features the early rock / rhythm and blues classic, "Money Honey", and new recordings of "What'd I Say" and "Skinny Minnie". (Sheridan's website has this as being released in 1988, a copyright notice also shows it as being 1994.)
 2002: Vagabond
 2018: Tony Sheridan and Opus 3 Artists

Live albums
 1963: Twist at the Star Club Hamburg A live album, Sheridan sings and plays on "Skinny Minny" and "What'd I Say" (under the pseudonym of "Dan Sherry") with the 'STAR COMBO' (a group including Roy Young, Colin "Melander" Crawley, Ricky Barnes and Johnny Watson). He also plays on "The Star Combo's" other four songs (where Roy Young sings). This release was a rare LP on Philips. As noted Sheridan is credited as "Dan Sherry" though his picture is clearly displayed on the front cover singing at 'The Star Club' (with bassist Colin "Melander" Crawley and saxophonist Ricky Barnes). (There are songs by four other groups as well).
 1974: Tony Sheridan Rocks on aka Live in Berlin '73
 1976: On My Mind (private release)
 1996: Tony Sheridan & The Beat Brothers Live And Dangerous (also released as "Rock Masters: Feel It" [Beat Brothers – Roy Young, Howie Casey – recordings of "Good Golly Miss Molly" and others. On some of these 1995 live-recordings the lead vocal is actually by Roy Young (aka "the English Little Richard").
 2004: Chantal Meets Tony Sheridan – only known live recording of the early McCartney/Sheridan song "Tell Me If You Can"
 2007: Tony Sheridan Live 2007 – Only known Sheridan recording of the Elvis classic "Don't Be Cruel", The Beatles "Yesterday", Chuck Berry's "Little Queenie" medleyed with "Johnny B. Goode". Also present Buddy Holly's "Not Fade Away" and James Taylor's "You've Got A Friend". Album photos taken by Sheridan's young wife Anna Sheridan.

EPs
 1962:  EP, released in France.
 1962: Ya Ya EP, released in Germany.
 2001: Historical Moments Tony Sheridan & Rod Davis (from John Lennon's Quarrymen) EP/CD
 2005: Tell Me If You Can (EP) Chantal feat. Geff Harrison – Tony Sheridan – this Sheridan version runs 6 min. 24 sec. and was taped at the Abbey Road Studios. The other three versions on this CD/EP are not by Sheridan.

Compilations
 1964: Ain't She Sweet (side 1) with the Beatles, recorded 1961
 1966: Meet the Beat (two versions, on 10-inch, 12-inch and CD, but with radically different tracks, sharing only two songs. The 12-inch features 1966 recordings of "Jailhouse Rock", "Fever" and "Shake, Rattle and Roll")

Singles
 1962: "Ich Lieb' Dich So (Ecstasy)/Der Kiss - Me Song"
 1965: "My Babe" (with the Big Six)
 1965: "Vive L'Amour" (Tony Sheridan & the Big Six, producer: Jimmy Bowien)
 1967: "Ich Lass Dich Nie Wieder Geh'n" (producer: Jimmy Bowien)

Other recordings
 1996 & 2001: Sheridan In Control (bootleg, also released as 'Fab Four Collection') "with The Beat Brothers- Roy Young, Howie Casey" – 1995 recordings of "Johnny B. Goode", "Money", "My Bonnie", "Skinny Minnie"
 2002: Influencia  (As a guest artist of the Argentinian musician, Charly Garcia).
 2008: ...and so it goes by Dave Humphries; Sheridan plays on five of 11 tracks

References

Further reading

 Sheridan biography, from Tony Sheridan's Website, retrieved from Archive.org, snapshot of August 27, 2007
 Daniels, Frank (1998, 2000, 2001) The Beatles with Tony Sheridan, retrieved 1 January 2005
 
 Thorsten Knublauch and Axel Korinth: Komm, Gib Mir Deine Hand – Die Beatles in Deutschland 1960–1970. Books on Demand Gmbh: 2008; 
 Krasker, Eric. The Beatles – Fact and Fiction 1960–1962, Paris, Séguier, 2009; 
 Mann, Alan. "The Teacher: The Tony Sheridan Story", Norwich, AMPS, 2013; 
 Crawley, Colin. "Tony Sheridan: The one The Beatles called 'The Teacher', 2015;

External links

 Alan Mann official web site of Tony Sheridan biographer Alan Mann.

The Beatles
1940 births
2013 deaths
Atco Records artists
Deaths in Germany
English expatriates in Germany
English male guitarists
English male singer-songwriters
British rock and roll musicians
English rock guitarists
English rock singers
People educated at the City of Norwich School
People from Thorpe St Andrew